The 12227 / 12228 Mumbai Central–Indore Duronto Express is a Superfast Express train of the Indian Railways connecting  (MMCT) to Indore (INDB). It is currently being operated with 12227 / 12228 train numbers.

Coach composition

The rake has 8 AC 3 tier coaches, 2 AC 2 tier coaches, 1 AC First Class, 1 Pantry car and 2 EOG cars making a total of 14 coaches. As is customary with Indian Railways, coaches are added/removed as per the demand.

Service

It is the fastest train on the Mumbai–Indore sector. It averages 65.88 km/hr as 12227 Duronto Express covering 829 km in 12 hrs 35 mins & 65.66 km/hr as 12228 Duronto Express covering 829 km in 12 hrs 40 mins.
The other train that connects Mumbai & Indore is the 12961/62 Avantika Express.

Train details

This train had its inaugural run on 28 January 2011. It was & still is a 2 days a week service. It is a fully AC train & uses LHB rakes.

Below is the rake sharing schedule:-
Rake A --- Thursday departure from BCT for INDB Rake A --- Saturday arrival @ BCT from INDB Rake A --- Resting @ BCT on Saturday Rake B -- Saturday departure from BCT for INDB Rake A -- Sunday departure from BCT for JP Rake B --- Monday arrival @ BCT from INDB Rake B --- Resting @ BCT on Monday Rake A --- Monday resting @ JP Rake A --- Arrival @ BCT on Wednesday from JP Rake B --- Wednesday departure from BCT for JP Rake B --- Friday arrival @ BCT from JP Rake B --- Resting @ BCT on Friday

Traction

When this train was introduced it was hauled by an Electric Loco Shed, Vadodara or Electric Loco Shed, Valsad-based WAP-4. Later on WAP-5 hauled it regularly. 
Now Vadodara-based WAP-7 locomotive hauls the train between Mumbai Central & Indore Jn. Most of the times the train has been seen with HOG-enabled WAP-7 loco. However occasionally the Vadodara-based WAP loco also hauls the train.

Stoppage

Schedule

Gallery

See also 

 Duronto Express
 Mumbai Central railway station
 Indore Junction BG
 Avantika Express

References

External links 
 http://www.wr.indianrailways.gov.in/view_detail.jsp?lang=0&dcd=55&id=0,4,268

Duronto Express trains
Rail transport in Madhya Pradesh
Rail transport in Gujarat
Rail transport in Maharashtra
Transport in Indore
Transport in Mumbai
2011 establishments in India
Railway services introduced in 2011